Yuri Levonovich Javadyan (1 January 1935 – 20 May 2022) was an Armenian politician. He served as Minister of Agriculture from February to December 1991. He died on 20 May 2022 at the age of 87.

References

1935 births
2022 deaths
20th-century Armenian politicians
Agriculture ministers of Armenia
People from Syunik Province
Recipients of the Order of the Red Banner of Labour